David S. Kenzer is a game designer who has worked primarily on role-playing games.

Career
David Kenzer started the game company Kenzer & Company with friends Brian Jelke and Steve Johansson, and their initial project was The Kingdom of Kalamar (1994), a systemless fantasy setting. Kenzer was a lawyer who knew how trademark law worked, and had "suitable for use with Advanced Dungeons & Dragons on the back cover, and included the disclaimer text "Advanced Dungeons & Dragons is a registered trademark of TSR Hobbies, Inc. Use of this trademark is NOT sanctioned by the holder." Following the publication of The Kingdom of Kalamar, Kenzer had formed a casual relationship with AEG, who was then putting out Shadis magazine, edited by Jolly Blackburn. When Blackburn left AEG, Kenzer and the staff of Kenzer & Company wanted to get Blackburn to join their company, and the turning point came in November 1996 when David Kenzer and others were visiting Blackburn over the course of a local con, during which Blackburn became convinced that Kenzer had the sort of business sense and integrity that he was looking for in a partner. Kenzer & Company began publishing Blackburn's Knights of the Dinner Table comic books, and starting with issue #5 (February 1997) it was not just the work of one person but instead of the "KoTD Development Team" which consisted of Blackburn, Kenzer, Jelke and Johansson. Kenzer acquired the license to Advanced Dungeons & Dragons from Wizards of the Coast that allowed the company to release HackMaster (2001) as a satire of AD&D. When Wizards released 4th edition D&D in 2008, Kenzer was unwilling to sign the Game System License that Wizards was offering, and he thus published a 501-page PDF of Kingdoms of Kalamar (2008) without authorization from Wizards.

References

External links
 David S. Kenzer :: Pen & Paper RPG Database archive

Living people
Role-playing game designers
Year of birth missing (living people)